Counterfeit Cat is an animated television series developed by Aardman Animations, Cristina Fiumara, and Ben Marsaud. The series is produced by Wildseed Kids, Tricon Kids & Family, and Aardman Animations, in association with Teletoon, with the participation of Disney XD, and with animation provided by Atomic Cartoons. The series first aired on Disney XD in the United Kingdom on May 12, 2016. In Canada, it premiered on November 1, 2016. A total of 52 episodes were produced.

Premise
The series revolves around the adventures of Max (Marc Wootton), a lazy yellow housecat, and Gark (Alex Kelly) a blue alien who disguised himself as a purple-knitted cat. Gark crashed his spaceship on Earth, landing in the laundry room of Betty (Kayvan Novak), a klutzy yet kind old woman who is Max's owner. Gark believes that Max is a tiger, the bravest species on Earth, despite Max's cowardice. The two often find themselves in surreal and dangerous situations due to Gark's unstable, bizarre powers, which Max often uses to his own advantage without thinking of the consequences.

Episodes

Characters

Main
Max (voiced by Marc Wootton), a yellow cat who lives a cushy life in Betty's home. Max often gets dragged along into dangerous and frightening adventures with Gark—adventures that he hates getting involved in. Despite taking advantage of Gark's powers it is shown several times throughout the series that he still cares for his best friend. His full name is Maximillian Fluffybottom III.
Gark (voiced by Alex Kelly), a young, fearless blue alien, who can disguise himself as a purple knitted cat. His dangerous powers and curiosity get him and Max into misadventures because he actually thinks Max is a tiger, the bravest species in the world.
Betty (voiced by Kayvan Novak), a kindhearted but klutzy elderly old woman who owns Max and Gark. In "Jackson 5", She is revealed that she had Jackson and Max (before Gark came to earth) when she was younger. She has a daughter named Jeanette and several deceased husbands as revealed in the episode, "Humanoid".
Throckmorton (voiced by Kayvan Novak), the artificial intelligence of Gark's ship, he is overprotective of Gark and acts like a father-figure to him, though when it comes to Max their attitudes clash.

Recurring
Staring Dog, a shaggy dog with big eyes and greyish brown fur, he constantly stares at Max which makes him uncomfortable and frightened. He made his debut in "Bin Juice" in the form of a cameo.
Ranceford (voiced by Katherine Ryan), a white cat who is odd-eyed. Max harbors a crush on her, but like the other animals, she prefers Gark over Max. She is the leader of The Sunshine Circle of Cats and denies Max membership.
The Kid (voiced by Kyle Soller), a flying squirrel. She lives in the park next to Betty's apartment and who is Nelson's best friend.
The Squirrels (voiced by Kyle Soller), three flying squirrels that also live next to Betty's apartment.
Nelson (voiced by Katherine Ryan), a dumb and overweight mixed-breed, green pigeon who is The Kid's best friend.
Cutter (voiced by Kayvan Novak), a light green-blue cat with yellow eyes and a purple hair. His voice is freakishly campy. His name is revealed in "Cat Box of Fear".
Anton (voiced by Kayvan Novak), a green dog with black hair. In his first appearance he is a bully to Max, but in later episodes isn't a threat.
Trash Can Hat Cat (voiced by Kayvan Novak), a cat with scruffy fur, he believes in wild conspiracy theories and is homeless.
Chico (voiced by Sandra Dickinson), a bounty hunter disguised as a puppy dog. She wants to kidnap Gark because there is a bounty on his head for driving his ship too fast.
Zaxos (voiced by Sandra Dickinson), a Wartian bounty hunter set out to capture Gark along with Chico. She later appeared in "Zaxos Returns" and claims to have changed her ways, but is actually out to steal Betty's cheeks.
The Cat Toy God (voiced by Kayvan Novak), Max's nemesis and the ruler of an alternate dimension found underneath Betty's sofa.
Jackson (voiced by Kayvan Novak), a dumb, light green, street, ear-torn, one legged, angry cat. He keeps dying and coming back from the dead, he blames Max for his deaths and tries to kill him but, like Anton, isn't a threat in later episodes.
Wilma (voiced by Kayvan Novak), an old woman who owns Staring Dog and one of Betty's friends.
Jeanette (voiced by Kayvan Novak), Betty's cat-obsessed daughter, she occasionally looks after Max and always brings costumes, something Max hates.

Supporting
Flargle (voiced by Sandra Dickinson), a purple three-eyed alien who posts on a blog about how bad of a planet Earth is, which causes Gark to be mad. He partners with Chico and Zaxos in the episode, "Gark's Got Talent". He makes his debut in "Mere Mortals".
Chameleon (voiced by Kerry Shale), a green chameleon who turned into a super villain by Gark in "The Gark Night Rises". He paired with Anton and Staring Dog in the episode, "Gark's Got Talent".
Jibbo (voiced by Alexa Kahn), a green and yellow alien who one of the saviors of Baa-Boo-Raa. She is introduced in the second part of "Gone Gark".
Baa-Boo-Raa (voiced by Reginald D. Hunter), a Sensei who chose Gark to save the universe by joining the saviors for training. He is introduced in "Gone Gark".
Jock (voiced by Kayvan Novak), an alien who is made of meat and from Planet Meathead. He is also one of the saviors. He makes his debut in the second part of "Gone Gark".

Production

Development
On December 3, 2010, Aardman Animations originally started the development for the show for Disney. The series is Aardman's first series to use traditional animation. The development was in co-production with Wildseed Studios to complete the development for the project together while Atomic Cartoons was hired to serve animation production and Tricon Films & Television committed to distribute the series until Sonar Entertainment had taken over its distribution.

The designs for the show were provided by Antoine Birot and Raphael Chabassol based on original designs by Nick Edwards. The series is directed by Ben Marsaud and produced by Sarah Mattingley. The first season consisted of 52 episodes at ten minutes each and coincided with 11 two-minute shorts.

Ben Marsaud (who is the director of the series) was a former storyboard artist of seasons 1–3 and 6 of Cartoon Network's original British-American children's animated series, The Amazing World of Gumball and is the current director of Netflix's original animated sitcom, F is for Family. Miles Bullough (who is the executive producer of the series) is also an executive producer on the animated shows, Shaun the Sheep, Timmy Time, Chop Socky Chooks & the Wallace & Gromit short film, A Matter of Loaf and Death for Aardman.

Animation
The animation services for the series is handled by Atomic Cartoons. The animation company also been known for Atomic Betty, Captain Flamingo and as well currently as the sixth and seventh seasons of Max & Ruby and Angry Birds Toons. The animation is made on Adobe Animate.

Broadcast
In the United Kingdom, the series debuted on Disney XD on May 12, 2016. It later aired on Pop, debuting on October 1, 2018. In Canada, it premiered on Teletoon on November 1, 2016.  In the United States, the first episode aired on Disney XD as a sneak preview on May 31, 2016, before officially premiering on June 20, 2016.

In Latin America, it began airing on Disney Channel and Disney XD on June 10, 2017. In Germany, it began airing on Disney XD on October 17, 2016.

As of May 2017, Sonar Entertainment has acquired the global rights to distribute the series, replacing its former owner, Tricon Films & Television.

Reception

Accolades

References

External links

Official website at Teletoon.com

2010s British animated television series
2010s British comic science fiction television series
2016 British television series debuts
2017 British television series endings
2010s Canadian animated television series
2010s Canadian comic science fiction television series
2016 Canadian television series debuts
2017 Canadian television series endings
Animated television series about cats
Animated television series about extraterrestrial life
British children's animated adventure television series
British children's animated comic science fiction television series
British flash animated television series
Canadian children's animated adventure television series
Canadian children's animated comic science fiction television series
Canadian flash animated television series
Disney XD original programming
English-language television shows
Teletoon original programming
Television series by Aardman Animations